Dipsas pakaraima is an arboreal snake of the family Dipsadidae. It has been placed in the Dipsas temporalis group. It is native to medium and higher elevations in west-central Guyana. It has been collected in Kaieteur National Park and Mount Ayanganna. Its food probably consists of snails and slugs.

References

pakaraima
Snakes of South America
Reptiles described in 2004
Reptiles of Guyana
Endemic fauna of Guyana